Oscar S. Gill (1880–1947) was an Alaskan Republican politician. He was Mayor of Anchorage, Alaska from 1932–1933 and 1934-1936.

Biography
Oscar Stephen Gill was born April 3, 1880 in St. Lawrence, Pennsylvania. He moved with his wife, Emma Dohrman Gill, to Alaska in 1907. In 1909, he ran a sawmill in Susitna, lived for a time in Knik, carrying mail by dog sled from Seward to Susitna and Iditarod. In 1915, he moved to Ship Creek to work on the Alaska Railroad. As the encampment at Ship Creek grew into the city of Anchorage, Gill put down roots, floating his two-story house down the Knik River to 918 W. 10th Avenue, where it remained until 1982.

From 1916-1923, Gill ran a lighterage service under contract with the Alaskan Engineering Commission. In 1923, he opened Anchorage's first garage at the corner of Fourth Avenue and I Street.

In 1929, Gill was elected to the city council, serving until 1932, when he was elected Mayor of Anchorage for one term. He did not stand for election in 1933, but ran for a second, non-consecutive term in 1934. He was elected without opposition on the ballot and served two more terms as mayor. His son, Victor Gill, made an unsuccessful bid to succeed him as Mayor of Anchorage in 1936.

In 1944, Oscar Gill was elected to the Alaska Territorial House of Representatives, representing the 3rd District. He was re-elected in 1946, becoming Speaker of the House in 1947. He died while still in office, November 18, 1947, and was buried in the  Anchorage Memorial Park.

The Oscar Gill House, threatened with demolition in 1982, was purchased by the Municipality of Anchorage and moved into storage. In 1994 it was restored to a new location at 1344 W. 10th Avenue. It now houses a bed and breakfast.

References 

 General
 Biography at the Oscar Gill House
 Oscar S. Gill at the Anchorage Memorial Park Cemetery
 Oscar S. Gill at the "Political Graveyard"
 Specific

Further reading
 Ritter, Charles F. and others, American Legislative Leaders in the West, 1911-1994, 1997

External links
 Oscar Gill at 100 Years of Alaska's Legislature

1880 births
1947 deaths
Alaska city council members
Businesspeople from Alaska
Mayors of Anchorage, Alaska
Members of the Alaska Territorial Legislature
People from Berks County, Pennsylvania
Speakers of the Alaska House of Representatives
Republican Party members of the Alaska House of Representatives
20th-century American politicians
20th-century American businesspeople